Tiến Thắng is a commune (xã) and village in Yên Thế District, Bắc Giang Province, in northeastern Vietnam. There are several lakes in the vicinity.

References

Populated places in Bắc Giang province
Communes of Bắc Giang province